Kevin Breit is a Canadian musician from Northern Canada. Breit has collaborated in numerous bands, and recorded solo albums on his own Poverty Playlist label, and Stony Plain Records. He is also well known for session work on numerous Grammy award winning albums by a wide range of artists including Cassandra Wilson and Norah Jones .

Projects
Kevin Breit is the leader of the quartet Sisters Euclid, comprising Breit, Ian DeSouza, Gary Taylor and Mark Lalama. Sisters Euclid formed in 1996, and have earned Juno and National Jazz Awards. In 2006, they released an instrumental jazz fusion album of Neil Young songs entitled Run Neil Run. 

Kevin and Cyro Baptista formed Supergenerous in 1998 and were signed to Blue Note Records.They recorded two records together.

Breit is a member of The Stretch Orchestra with fellow "quite tall" musicians Matt Brubeck and drummer Jesse Stewart. Their self titled recording won a Juno Award in 2012 for Best Instrumental Album. 

Kevin and Harry Manx have recorded three albums together, collecting a Maple Blues Award. He also performs as a solo artist, and as a member of the folk group Folkalarm. Breit's "Ernesto and Delilah" earned a National Folk Award.

Session work
Breit has performed on albums that have earned 13 Grammy Awards,  recording with Cassandra Wilson, Norah Jones, k.d lang, Hugh Laurie, Rosanne Cash, Holly Cole, Serena Ryder, Amos Lee, Carlos Del Junco, Molly Johnson, Marc Jordan, Natalie MacMaster, Michael Kaeshammer, Quartette, Ian Tyson, Malcolm Burn, Suzie Vinnick, Susanna Baca, Janis Ian, Jeb Loy Nichols, Jane Siberry, Yvette Tollar, Lynne Myles, The Wailin Jennies, the Barra MacNeills, Sylvia Tyson, Ruth Moody, Dal Bello, Steve Bell, Lynn Hanson, John McDermott, Lindy Ortega, and many others. .

Discography
 Jubilee (2003) Harry Manx & Kevin Breit
 In Good We Trust (2007) Harry Manx & Kevin Breit
 Maybelle and Empty (2010)
 Supergenerous & Sao Paulo Slim (with Cyro Baptista) (2010)
 Best of Folkalarm (2010)
 Strictly Whatever  (2011) Harry Manx & Kevin Breit
 Burnt Bulb on Broadway (2011)
 Simple Earnest Plea (2011)
 Field Recording (2013)
 Ernesto and Delilah (with Rebecca Jenkins) (2015)
 Johnny Goldtooth and the Chevy Casanovas (2017)
 Stella Bella Strada (2019)
 Yearning Soul Rebellion (2022)
 Breit Workman (2022) Kevin Breit and Hawksley Workman

As guest
 2003 Johnny's Blues: A Tribute to Johnny Cash (Northern Blues)

References

External links
 The Sisters Euclid and Kevin Breit Website
 http://www.allmusic.com/artist/the-sisters-euclid-mn0001361732/biography

Year of birth missing (living people)
Place of birth missing (living people)
Living people
Canadian session musicians
People from Wellington County, Ontario
Canadian folk guitarists
Canadian male guitarists
Canadian jazz guitarists
Canadian rock guitarists
Canadian mandolinists
People from Sudbury District
Musicians from Ontario
Canadian Folk Music Award winners
Canadian male jazz musicians
Stony Plain Records artists